Großolbersdorf is a municipality in the district Erzgebirgskreis in Saxony, Germany.

References 

Erzgebirgskreis